Agapanthia intermedia is a species of longhorn beetle in the subfamily Lamiinae found in Central and Eastern Europe, Romania, Slovakia, and the Netherlands and Kazakhstan. The colour of the species is black. It flies from May to June, and feeds on Knautia arvensis.

References

intermedia
Beetles described in 1883
Beetles of Europe